Gary Keith Robertson (born 15 July 1960) is a former New Zealand cricketer. He played one Test match and ten One Day Internationals for New Zealand.

Robertson also played for Taranaki in the Hawke Cup.

Family
Robertson was born in New Plymouth. He has two children. He is the older brother of cricketer Stephen Robertson.

See also
 One-Test wonder

External links

"Limited Overs: Gary Robertson" 

1960 births
Living people
New Zealand cricketers
New Zealand Test cricketers
New Zealand One Day International cricketers
Central Districts cricketers
Cricketers from New Plymouth
Buckinghamshire cricketers
North Island cricketers